Club Sportif Avionnais or simply CS Avion is a French professional football club founded in 1922. They are based in Avion, Pas-de-Calais and are currently competing in the Championnat de France Amateurs 2 Group B, the fifth tier in the French football league system. They play at the Stade François-Blin, which has a capacity of 4,800 spectators. They are a regular participant in the Coupe de France, often appearing in the stages where the professional clubs enter.

History
Club Sportif Avionnais was founded in 1922. The club's great success came early in their existence. During the 1950s, as an amateur club, they reached the Coupe de France Round of 64 and Round of 32 on several occasions. In league play, the club has only made it as far as the Championnat de France Amateurs, their last appearance being during the 2004–05 season, in which they were relegated after four consecutive seasons there. Following their quick relegation from CFA 2, they were relocated to the Division d'Honneur de Nord-Pas-de-Calais. After two seasons there, they achieved promotion back to CFA 2 for the 2008–09 season.

They had a remarkable run during the 2007–08 Coupe de France, where they made it all the way to the Round of 64 before being eliminated by Ligue 1 club and lesser rivals Lille OSC. The club also operates a successful youth team, which is usually composed of young players that have been rejected or released from bigger Nord-Pas-de-Calais clubs, such as RC Lens and Lille. They appear often in the Coupe Gambardella reaching as far as the quarterfinals during the 2005–06 season.

Current squad
As of Tue Mar 02 , 2011

Former players

  Zico Tumba

Honours
Coupe d'Artois: 1995, 1994, 1991
Division d'Honneur de Nord-Pas-de-Calais: 2000, 1958
Regional League de Nord-Pas-de-Calais: 1986, 1982
Promotion League de Nord-Pas-de-Calais: 1993

References

External links
 Official Site

 
Association football clubs established in 1922
1922 establishments in France
Sport in Pas-de-Calais
Football clubs in France
Football clubs in Hauts-de-France